Douglass is a surname. Notable people with the surname include:

 Abel Douglass (before 1849 – c. 1907), American whaler
 A. E. Douglass (1867–1962), American astronomer
 Astyanax Douglass (1897–1975), Major League Baseball catcher for the Cincinnati Reds
 Bill Douglass (1923–1994), American jazz drummer
 Bobby Douglass (born 1947), American football quarterback for the Chicago Bears
 Brooks Douglass (1963-2020), American lawyer, politician, and actor
 Charles Douglass (1910–2003), American sound engineer, credited as the inventor of the laugh track
 Charles Remond Douglass (1844–1920), African-American clerk and soldier
 Dale Douglass (born 1936), American professional golfer
 David Douglass (physicist), American physicist
 David John Douglass, British trade unionist, political activist and writer
 Dorothea Lambert Chambers (née Douglass, 1878–1960), English tennis player
 Frank Douglass (1875–1972), South African rugby union player
 Frederick Douglass (1818–1895), American abolitionist and writer
 Gregory Douglass (born 1980), American singer-songwriter
 Gordon K. (Sandy) Douglass (1904–1992), American racer, designer, and builder of sailing dinghies
 Harry Douglass, Baron Douglass of Cleveland (1902–1978), British trade unionist
 Herbert E. Douglass (1927–2014), American Seventh-day Adventist theologian
 Jack Douglass, American internet personality, musician and comedian on YouTube
 James Nicholas Douglass (1826–1898), English civil engineer, lighthouse builder and designer
 James W. Douglass, American author, activist, and Christian theologian
 Jimmy Douglass, American recording engineer and record producer
 Joe Douglass (born 1974), American football player for the Las Vegas Gladiators
 John J. Douglass (1873–1939), member of the United States House of Representatives from Massachusetts
 John Thomas Douglass (1847–1886), American violinist, composer of Virginia's Ball
 John W. Douglass (born 1941), United States Air Force officer
 John Watkinson Douglass (1827–1909), American politician
 Joseph Douglass (1871–1935), African-American concert violinist
 Kingman Douglass (1896–1971), American investment banker, member of the United States intelligence community
 Klondike Douglass (1872–1953), American Major League Baseball player born in Boston
 Lavantia Densmore Douglass (1827–1899), American social reformer
 Leon Douglass (1869–1940), American inventor
 Linda Douglass, director of communications for the White House Office of Health Reform in the Obama Administration
 Lewis Henry Douglass (1840–1908), American typesetter and soldier
 Mabel Smith Douglass (1874–1933), American educator
 Maurice Douglass, American football player
 Mike Douglass (American football), American football player
 Mike Douglass (urban planner), American urban planner and social scientist
 Pat Douglass, American basketball player and coach
 Paul Douglass (1905–1988), American academic administrator
 Ralph Waddell Douglass (1895–1971), American commercial artist and university professor
 Ramona Douglass, African-American activist
 Richard Douglass (1746–1828), American militia officer and cooper
 Robyn Douglass, American actress
 Samuel T. Douglass (1814–1898), American justice
 Sara Douglass (1957–2011), Australian author
 Sean Douglass, American baseball player
 Stephen Douglass, American actor
 Stu Douglass (born 1990), American-Israeli basketball player
 Susan L. Douglass, American educator and author
 William Douglass (engineer), Chief Engineer for the Commissioners of Irish Lights
 William Douglass (physician) (c. 1691–1752), American physician and pamphleteer
 William Boone Douglass (born 1864), American lawyer, engineer, surveyor, genealogist and anthropologist

See also
Douglass (disambiguation)
Douglas (surname)
Douglass family